The Big Walnut Creek Nature Preserve, or simply Walnut Creek Preserve, is a  nature preserve located in northeast Austin, Texas in the United States.

Notes

Nature reserves in Texas
Protected areas of Texas
Parks in Austin, Texas